KVQT-LD (channel 21) is a low-power television station in Houston, Texas, United States, which maintains affiliations with several digital multicast networks. The station is owned by C. Dowen Johnson. KVQT-LD's transmitter is located near Missouri City, in unincorporated northeastern Fort Bend County.

History
The station was founded on May 1, 1990, on channel 24, but moved to channel 21 in 2005 due to displacement by KETH-TV's digital signal.

The station has had the KVQT call letters since August 2000.

KVQT was converted from analog to digital operation on June 12, 2009 by Skip Marsden of E.L. Marsden Wireless of Terrell, Texas, the manufacturer of the KVQT transmitter. KVQT began digital television broadcasting with two standard definition program streams, and has expanded to four.

The station was granted a minor change in call sign (from KVQT-LP to KVQT-LD) on May 4, 2010.

Subchannels
The station's digital signal is multiplexed:

See also
 Jorge and Lorena Gamboa

References

External links

Independent television stations in the United States
VQT-LD
Television channels and stations established in 1990
Low-power television stations in the United States
1990 establishments in Texas
Retro TV affiliates
Classic Reruns TV affiliates
Heartland (TV network) affiliates